"The Jungle" is episode 77 of the American television anthology series The Twilight Zone, and is the third twelfth episode of the third season. It first aired on December 1, 1961. The teleplay was written by Charles Beaumont, based on his short story of the same name, and was directed by recurring director William F. Claxton.

Opening narration

Plot
Alan Richards and his wife Doris have recently returned from Africa, where Alan's company is constructing a hydroelectric dam. He discovers she has secretly kept several items given to her by a local shaman for protection. When he confronts her about them, she says she is frightened by the natives opposed to the dam and begs him to stop construction. He burns one of the items and opens the door to leave for work. In the hallway of his apartment building, just outside his door, is the carcass of a dead goat.

Alan attends a board meeting, where they discuss the dam and the fact that, although the natives will benefit from it in the long run, they are upset that they will be displaced in order to build it. He warns that the local witch doctors have threatened to use black magic against anyone associated with the project. When the other board members scoff, he points out their own superstitions: one carries a rabbit's foot, another practices astrology, and even the building does not have a 13th floor.

Later, he is in a bar drinking with a friend, and shows him a lion's-tooth amulet Doris has given him. Supposedly the tooth will protect him against a lion attack. Alan begins to head home but finds his car won't start. He attempts to return to the bar but it is locked and he has forgotten his lion's-tooth amulet inside. He attempts to use a pay phone, but it's out of order. As Alan walks away, the phone rings. He answers it and hears jungle sounds.

He heads home on foot, still hearing the jungles and tribal drums all around him, becoming nervous and agitated. He tries to take a taxi home, but the driver dies suddenly while stopped at a traffic light. Alan meets a bum and asks him about the jungle noises, which the bum claims not to hear. He offers the bum money to escort him through the park, but the bum disappears while Alan's back is turned.

Alan continues on, and finally reaches the safety of his apartment. The noises suddenly stop. Relieved, Alan enters and pours himself a drink. He hears a lion's roar from the bedroom. When he opens the bedroom door, he finds a lion on the bed, as well as his wife's corpse, as the lion leaps toward him.

Closing narration

Cast
 John Dehner as Alan Richards
 Emily McLaughlin as Doris Richards
 Walter Brooke as Chad Cooper
 Jay Adler as Vagrant
 Hugh Sanders as Mr. Templeton
 Howard Wright as Mr. Hardy
 Donald Foster as Mr. Sinclair

Production
 The original short story by Charles Beaumont appeared in If Magazine in 1954
 The soundtrack featured stock from from "King Nine Will Not Return" by Fred Steiner, and African tribal music

References

 DeVoe, Bill. (2008). Trivia from The Twilight Zone. Albany, GA: Bear Manor Media. 
 Grams, Martin. (2008). The Twilight Zone: Unlocking the Door to a Television Classic. Churchville, MD: OTR Publishing. 
 Zicree, Marc Scott: The Twilight Zone Companion. Sillman-James Press, 1982 (second edition)

External links
 

1961 American television episodes
The Twilight Zone (1959 TV series season 3) episodes
Television shows written by Charles Beaumont
Television episodes about witchcraft